Soul Stream is the second album by American saxophonist George Braith recorded in 1963 and released on the Blue Note label.

Reception
The Allmusic review by Stephen Thomas Erlewine awarded the album 4 stars and stated "Soul Stream finds George Braith coming into his own. Where his debut felt hampered by uneven material and unsure execution of Braith's trademark double-sax attack, Soul Stream is confident and assured... Unfortunately, Braith never truly cuts loose, but there's enough provocative material and cerebral grooves on Soul Stream to make it a worthwhile listen".

Track listing
All compositions by George Braith except where noted
 "The Man I Love" (Gershwin, Gershwin) - 5:26
 "Outside Around the Corner" - 7:52
 "Soul Stream" - 3:14
 "Boop Bop Bing Bash" (Billy Gardner) - 6:23
 "Billy Told" (Traditional) - 7:52
 "Jo Anne" - 5:21

Personnel
George Braith - tenor saxophone, soprano saxophone, stritch 
Billy Gardner - organ 
Grant Green - guitar
Hugh Walker - drums

References

Blue Note Records albums
George Braith albums
1964 albums
Albums produced by Alfred Lion
Albums recorded at Van Gelder Studio